Carita Letitia Huckaby (née Jenkins, born 1972) is an American photographer who creates multimedia artwork combining photography and textiles to depict both family narratives and African American history.

Art 
The mixing of materials to reveal historical topics is exemplified by her 2015 Bayou Baroque exhibit honoring the nuns at the Sisters of the Holy Family Mother House in New Orleans, Louisiana. The pieces show nuns photographed in front of bed sheets with intricate floral patterns, presenting black women with the same solemn compositional weight as that shown in older master religious paintings. At the same time, the works echo the flowered backgrounds of Kehinde Wiley’s contemporary portraits, but bring a domestic twist to the flat plains.

Huckaby was one of the artists selected by independent curators to participate in the 2013 Texas Biennial, which showcases "the best emerging and established visual artists in Texas."

She has exhibited at the Dallas Contemporary; the Galveston Arts Center in Galveston, Texas; Renaissance Fine Art in Harlem, New York; the McKenna Museum in New Orleans; the Tyler Museum of Art; and the Dallas African-American Museum. Her work is part of the permanent collections of the Art Museum of Southeast Texas in Beaumont, the Samella Lewis Contemporary Art Collection at Scripps College in Claremont, California, and the Brandywine Workshop in Philadelphia, Pennsylvania. Her one-woman show "Beautiful Blackness" was exhibited at the new Foto Relevance Gallery in the Houston Museum District in 2020.

Huckaby has also created public art projects, including a piece along the Trinity River in Fort Worth at the 4th Street trailhead, one at the Ella Mae Shamblee Branch library in Fort Worth, and an installation of glass panels at the new Highland Hills Branch Library in Dallas, which reveals silhouettes of community members above the library's main entrance.

She has also given public lectures at the Fort Worth Contemporary Arts Center and the Dallas Contemporary.

Biography

Huckaby earned a degree in Journalism from the University of Oklahoma in 1994, a BFA focusing on art photography from the Art Institute of Boston in 2001, and an MFA in photography from the University of North Texas in 2010. She is married to painter Sedrick Huckaby.

References

External links
Video from NPR’s Art and Seek: “Studio Tour with Letitia Huckaby"
 
Biography at the Liliana Bock Gallery

American multimedia artists
American textile artists
1972 births
Living people
African-American contemporary artists
American contemporary artists
African-American photographers
African-American women artists
University of Oklahoma alumni
University of North Texas alumni
Artists from Texas
Photographers from Texas
20th-century American photographers
21st-century American photographers
Women textile artists
20th-century American women photographers
21st-century American women photographers
20th-century African-American women
20th-century African-American artists
21st-century African-American women
21st-century African-American artists